is an art museum in Fukuoka, Japan. It contains a notable collection of Asian art and exhibits various temporary exhibitions. In November 2010 it hosted a large exhibition of Marc Chagall's work.

The Madonna of Port Lligat by Salvador Dalí is exhibited at this museum.

Fukuoka Asian Art Triennale 
The Fukuoka Asian Art Triennale is held every three years with a different theme. Organized by The Executive Committee of the Fukuoka Asian Art Triennale and began in 1999, it introduces the latest in art from 21 countries and regions throughout Asia.

 The 1st Fukuoka Asian Art Triennale (1999) 
 The 2nd Fukuoka Asian Art Triennale (2002)
 The 3rd Fukuoka Asian Art Triennale (2005)
 The 4th Fukuoka Asian Art Triennale (2009)
 The 5th Fukuoka Asian Art Triennale (2014)

See also 
 Fukuoka Oriental Ceramics Museum

References

External links
 
 Fukuoka Art Museum at Google Cultural Institute

Art museums and galleries in Japan
Buildings and structures in Fukuoka
Museums in Fukuoka Prefecture
Tourist attractions in Fukuoka